The 2019 Honkbal Hoofdklasse season began Thursday, April 4.

Standings

References

Honkbal Hoofdklasse
2019 in baseball